The Craftsman is a book by Richard Sennett about craftmanship and its importance to individuals and society.

Synopses
The book is divided into a prologue,   ten chapters split over three parts, and a conclusion.  Sennett argues that the spirit of craftmanship involves the "desire to do a job well for its own sake".  For Sennett, people motivated purely by material rewards or competition do not tend to produce as good work as those motivated by a sense of craftmanship. The author also argues that being able to participate in craftmanship - as opposed to mere labour, or even to cerebral activity - is good for people's well being.  He tracks the waxing and waning of the craftmanship ethos across history. In the conclusion, Sennett states that the book was written to counter the dim view of manual work arising from the influential  Hannah Arendt.

References 

 
 
 
 
 
 
 
 
 
 
 
 
 
 

2008 non-fiction books
Yale University Press books